Pic de Salòria is a mountain of Catalonia, Spain.

References

Mountains of Catalonia
Mountains of the Pyrenees
Two-thousanders of Spain